High Speed 2 (HS2) is a planned high-speed railway line in England, the first phase of which is under construction in stages and due for completion between 2029 and 2033, depending on approval for later stages. The new line will run from its southern terminus in London to its most northerly point, Manchester, with branches to Birmingham and the East Midlands. HS2 will be Britain's second purpose-built high-speed line, the first being High Speed 1, which connects London to the Channel Tunnel.

At its southern end, the line will terminate at London's Euston station while other termini will be Birmingham Curzon Street station and Manchester Piccadilly station. In addition to these stations, the dedicated track will serve Old Oak Common in west London, Birmingham Interchange, East Midlands Parkway south of Nottingham, Crewe, and Manchester Airport. There will be several junctions for trains to progress onto the existing West Coast Main Line and Midland Main Line to reach towns and cities in Scotland, North West and North East England, and the West and East Midlands, which are not served by the new high-speed track. Future trains may be "captive", to be used solely on the high-speed spine.

The project is to be accomplished in three phases. Phase 1, which is under construction, is from London to a junction with the West Coast Main Line near Lichfield with a branch to Birmingham. Construction on the line began in 2020 with tunnelling beginning under the Chiltern Hills on the edge of northwest London in 2021. Phase 2a, from Lichfield to a second junction with the West Coast Main Line at Crewe, has achieved royal assent but full construction has not yet commenced. Phase 2b is from Crewe to Manchester, with a link to the West Coast Main Line at Crewe for trains to continue to Scotland, and from the West Midlands to East Midlands Parkway where HS2 joins the conventional rail Midland Main Line. Phase 2b is awaiting parliamentary approval.

The original design for HS2 was a "Y" network, with two legs forking at Birmingham. The fork to the west was to proceed to the North West of England at Golborne south of Wigan, where it would connect onto the West Coast Main Line to Scotland, with a branch to Manchester. The fork to the east was to proceed to the northeast of England, at York, where it would connect to the East Coast Main Line to Newcastle upon Tyne, with a branch to Leeds. There was to be a link in London across Camden, joining HS2 to HS1 and thus giving access to the continent via the Channel Tunnel from all major cities. There was also to be a link from Uxbridge to Heathrow Airport.

The proposed network has been cut substantially since it was announced in 2013. Links to HS1 and Heathrow were dropped at an early stage. From November 2021 to June 2022, substantial parts of HS2 were dropped. As part of the Integrated Rail Plan for the North and Midlands, it was announced that most of the eastern leg of phase 2b from Birmingham via the East Midlands to Leeds/York would be dropped. The branch from Coleshill near Birmingham towards Nottingham remains, with the route diverted to the existing East Midlands Parkway station, where trains can continue north onto the conventional rail Midland Main Line. The link from Golborne onto the West Coast Main Line was dropped.

The project has both supporters and opponents. Supporters of the project believe that the additional capacity and reliability provided by HS2 will accommodate passenger numbers rising to pre-COVID-19 levels while driving a further modal shift to rail. Opponents believe that the project is neither environmentally nor financially sustainable. In 2019, in response to criticism, the government ordered a review of the project, chaired by the project's former chairman, Douglas Oakervee, which recommended that the entire project proceed as planned. However, the Integrated Rail Plan for the North and Midlands, released in November 2021, cut back the project, as well as the Northern Powerhouse Rail (NPR) project it is integrated with. In 2010, the construction costs of HS2 were estimated to be between £30.9billion and £36billion; in 2015, this estimate was combined with the cost of rolling stock, and adjusted for inflation, to result in a budget of £56.6billion. Oakervee's 2019 review estimated the project would cost up to £87billion at 2019 prices for the originally envisioned "Y" network.

History

In 2003, High-speed rail arrived in the United Kingdom with the opening of the first part of High Speed 1, then known as the  Channel Tunnel Rail Link between London and the Channel Tunnel. In 2009, the Department for Transport (DfT) under the Labour government proposed to assess the case for a second high-speed line, which was to be developed by a new company, High Speed Two Limited (HS2 Ltd).

In December 2010, following a review by the Conservative–Liberal Democrat coalition, a route was proposed, subject to public consultation, based on a Y-shaped route from London to Birmingham with branches to Leeds and Manchester, as originally put forward by the previous Labour government, with alterations designed to minimise the visual, noise, and other environmental impacts of the line.

In January 2012, the Secretary of State for Transport announced that HS2 would go ahead in two phases and the legislative process would be achieved through two hybrid bills. The High Speed Rail (London - West Midlands) Act 2017, authorising the construction of Phase 1, passed both Houses of Parliament and received Royal Assent in February 2017. A Phase 2a High Speed Rail (West Midlands–Crewe) bill, seeking the power to construct Phase 2 as far as Crewe and to make decisions on the remainder of the Phase 2b route, was introduced in July 2017. Phase 2a received royal assent in February 2021.

One of the stated aims of the project is to increase the capacity of the railway network. It is envisaged that the introduction of HS2 will free up space on existing railway lines by removing a number of express services, thus allowing additional local train services to run and enabling the network to handle increased passenger numbers. Network Rail considers that constructing a new high-speed railway will be more cost-effective and less disruptive than upgrading the existing conventional rail network. The DfT has forecast that improved connectivity will have a positive economic impact, and that favourable journey times and ample capacity will generate a modal shift from air and road to rail.

Oakervee Review
On 21 August 2019, the DfT ordered an independent review of the project. The review was chaired by Douglas Oakervee, a British civil engineer, who had been HS2's non-executive chairman for nearly two years. The review was published by the DfT on 11 February 2020, alongside a statement from the Prime Minister confirming that HS2 would go ahead in full, with reservations. Oakervee's conclusions were that the original rationale for High Speed 2—to provide capacity and reliability on the rail network—was still valid, and that no "shovel-ready" interventions existed that could be deployed within the timeframe of the project. As a consequence, Oakervee recommended that the project go ahead as planned, subject to a series of further recommendations. After concluding that the project should proceed, the review recommended a further review of HS2 that would be undertaken by the Infrastructure and Projects Authority and would concentrate on reducing costs and over-specification. Measures such as reducing the speed of trains and their frequency, and general cost-cutting predominately affecting Phase 2b, would be assessed. On 15 April 2020, formal approval was given to construction companies to start work on the project.

Integrated Rail Plan
On 18 November 2021, the government's delayed Integrated Rail Plan was published. The plan significantly affected parts of the HS2 programme, including curtailing much of the eastern leg.

Under the original proposal for the eastern leg, the high-speed line would have been built with a link to the East Coast Mainline south of York for trains to continue to Newcastle. A branch would take trains into Leeds. There would also have been a branch to the Midland Main Line north of Derby for trains to continue to Sheffield. The original scheme also included a through station at Toton, between Nottingham and Derby. The HS2 eastern section was largely eliminated, leaving a branch from Coleshill near Birmingham to East Midlands Parkway station, just south of Nottingham and Derby, where the HS2 track would end, with trains continuing north onto the Midland Main Line to serve the existing stations at Nottingham, Derby, Chesterfield, and Sheffield. HS2 trains would serve the centres of Nottingham and Derby, unlike in the previous proposal. 

Upgrades to the East Coast Main Line have been proposed to offer time improvements on the London to Leeds and Newcastle routes. Services from Birmingham to Leeds and Newcastle are still planned to use the remaining section of the HS2 eastern leg. The London to Sheffield service will remain on the Midland Main Line, to equal the proposed original HS2 journey times. The integrated Rail Plan proposed a study to determine the best way for HS2 trains to reach Leeds.

In June 2022, the Golborne spur was removed from the Crewe-to-Manchester Parliamentary Bill. Without this link, trains to Scotland would join the existing West Coast Main Line further south at Crewe, instead of south of Wigan. The Department of Transport stated that the government was considering the recommendations of the Union Connectivity Review, which gave alternatives such as a more northerly HS2 connection to the West Coast Main Line than Golborne and upgrades to the West Coast Main Line from Crewe to Preston. The Department of Transport will publish its response subject to the funding allocated in the integrated Rail Plan.

Route

Branches and junctions
The branches off the main high-speed HS2 railway line and shared HS2/NPR line are at:
 Coleshill, east of Birmingham, west to Birmingham Curzon Street;
 Coleshill, east of Birmingham, east to East Midlands Parkway, where HS2 track branches into the Midland Main Line;
 Lichfield to the West Coast Main Line, this branch to be used for all trains heading north of Lichfield after phase 1, after 2a to be only for trains calling at Stafford, Stoke-on-Trent, and Macclesfield;
 directly north of Crewe to the West Coast Main Line, this branch to be used for HS2 trains heading north from the Crewe Hub, and also into the hub from the north;
 directly south of Crewe to the West Coast Main Line, this branch to be used for HS2 trains heading south from the Crewe Hub, and also into the hub from the south;
 Millington, at junction with shared HS2 track, east to Manchester;
 Millington, at junction with shared NPR track, west to Warrington.

There are two major four-way high-speed junctions on the line, at Coleshill east of Birmingham and at Millington between Warrington and Manchester. Both junctions route trains north, south, east, and west. The junction at Crewe, the Crewe Hub, is primarily a conventional rail junction with a station capable of serving high-speed. There will be access points from high-speed HS2 track north and south of the junction. High-speed trains can bypass the junction using high-speed track though a north-south aligned tunnel bored under the station and junction.

Phase 1: London to Birmingham

Phase 1 will create a new high-speed line between London and Birmingham to be completed by approximately 2031. A high-speed link will also be provided to the existing conventional rail West Coast Main Line just north of Lichfield in Staffordshire, providing services to the North West of England and Scotland. The line is flanked by the West Coast Main Line and the Chiltern Line.

Four stations will be included on the route: the London and Birmingham city centre terminals will be London Euston and Birmingham Curzon Street, with interchanges at Old Oak Common and Birmingham Interchange, respectively.

The route to the north begins at Euston station in London, entering a twin-bore tunnel near the Mornington Street Bridge at the station's throat. After continuing through to the Old Oak Common underground station, trains proceed through a second,  tunnel, emerging to the surface at its northwestern portal. The line crosses the Colne Valley Regional Park on the Colne Valley Viaduct and then enters a  tunnel under the Chiltern Hills, to emerge near South Heath, northwest of Amersham. It will run roughly parallel to the A413 road and the London to Aylesbury Line, to the west of Wendover. This is a green cut-and-cover tunnel under farmland, with soil spread over the final construction in order to reduce the visual impact of the line, reduce noise, and allow use of the land above the tunnels for agriculture. After passing west of Aylesbury, the route will run along the corridor of the former Great Central Main Line, joining the alignment north of Quainton Road to travel through rural Buckinghamshire and Oxfordshire up to Mixbury, south of Brackley, from where it will cross the A43 and open countryside through South Northamptonshire and Warwickshire, passing immediately south of Southam. After progressing through a tunnel bored under Long Itchington Wood, the route will pass through rural areas between Kenilworth and Coventry, crossing the A46 to enter the West Midlands.

Birmingham Interchange Station will be on the outskirts of Solihull, close to the strategic road network, including the M42, M6, M6 toll, and A45, all crossed on viaducts, and to Birmingham Airport and the National Exhibition Centre. North of the station a complex triangular junction, with six tracks at one section, west of Coleshill, will link the HS2 Birmingham city centre spur with the line continuing north, from which phase 2a proceeds and phase 2b will be developed. The northern limit for Phase 1 will be a connection onto the West Coast Main Line near Lichfield. This part of the line would be operative with compatible high-speed trains moving onto the conventionally tracked West Coast Main Line while the western leg of Phase 2 is under construction. The Birmingham city centre spur will be routed along the Water Orton rail corridor, the Birmingham to Derby line through Castle Bromwich, and through a tunnel past Bromford.

The section from Lichfield to Crewe is a part of Phase 2a that is to be built simultaneously with Phase 1, effectively merging Phase 2a with Phase 1. The proposed Crewe Hub, incorporating a station catering for high-speed trains, will be built as part of Phase 2a.

Phase 2: Birmingham to Manchester and East Midlands Parkway

Phase 2, is the section from Birmingham to Manchester, and the branch from Birmingham to East Midlands Parkway. Phase 2 is split into three sub-phases:
 Phase 2a, West Midlands to Crewe;
 Phase 2b west, Crewe to Manchester; 
 Phase 2b east, a branch from the West Midlands to East Midlands Parkway.

Phase 2a: West Midlands to Crewe
This phase extends the line northwest to the Crewe Hub from the northern extremity of Phase 1, north of Lichfield. At Lichfield, HS2 also connects to the West Coast Main Line. Opening a year after Phase 1, most of the construction of phase 2a will be in parallel with Phase 1. Phase 2a was approved by the House of Commons in July 2019,
and received Royal Assent on 11 February 2021.

The Crewe Hub is an important addition to the HS2 network, giving additional connectivity to existing lines radiating from the Crewe junction. The components are:
 An upgraded station at Crewe, to cope with high-speed trains.
 A tunnel under the station to allow HS2 trains to bypass the station while remaining on high-speed tracks.
 Branches onto the West Coast Main Line immediately to the south and north of the station, to allow HS2 trains to enter the station.

Phase 2b: Crewe to Manchester, western section
HS2 track continues north from Crewe. As the line passes through Cheshire at Millington, it branches to Manchester, using a triangular junction. At this junction, the line will also branch to Warrington on NPR track. The Manchester branch veers east, proceeding through a station at Manchester airport, with the line then entering a  tunnel under the suburbs of south Manchester. It is proposed that the tunnel will be served by four large ventilation shafts, to be built along the route. Manchester Piccadilly High Speed station will accommodate HS2 and NPR high-speed trains.

Phase 2b: West Midlands to Midland Main Line branch, eastern section
The line branches onto the Midland Main Line with trains only progressing north from the branch.

Possible future phases
Whether this will be part of HS2 or NPR has not been determined.

Liverpool
The Liverpool City Region was excluded from having direct HS2 track access.

In February 2016, the Liverpool City Council offered £2billion towards funding a direct HS2 line into the city centre. Steve Rotheram, the Metro Mayor of the Liverpool City Region, announced the creation of a Station Commission to determine the size, type, and location of a new "transport hub" in Liverpool's city centre, a station that would link the HS2 mainline with the local transport infrastructure. The station would serve HS2 and NPR trains. The North's Strategic Transport Plan recognised the need for a new station to accommodate HS2 and NPR trains.

In the HS2 plan, after phase 2a opens, Liverpool trains would use the HS2 track from London as far as Crewe, where they would use the existing conventional rail track on the West Coast Main Line to proceed to Liverpool Lime Street, with a stop at Runcorn.

The Integrated Rail Plan proposes to connect Liverpool to HS2 on a reused and upgraded Fiddlers Ferry freight line, from Ditton junction in Halebank to a new station at Warrington Bank Quay Low-Level, which will be shared with Northern Powerhouse Rail trains, then onto high-speed track from Warrington to London. Transport for the North's preferred option was a new high-speed line from Liverpool to the HS2 track into Manchester from Millington junction, with a stop at Warrington, which would also double as a connection from Liverpool to HS2 via Millington. The revised plans under the Integrated Rail Plan has a high-speed line only east of Warrington, with HS2 and Northern Powerhouse Rail trains reaching Liverpool Lime Street from Warrington on upgraded conventional rail track. Metro mayor Steve Rotheram, along with Greater Manchester's mayor Andy Burnham, was scathingly critical of the Integrated Rail Plan.

Scotland
In 2009, the then transport secretary Lord Adonis outlined a policy for high-speed rail in the UK as an alternative to domestic air travel, with particular emphasis on travel between the major cities of Scotland and England, "I see this as the union railway, uniting England and Scotland, north and south, richer and poorer parts of our country, sharing wealth and opportunity, pioneering a fundamentally better Britain".

In June 2011, business and governmental organisations—including Network Rail, CBI Scotland, and Transport Scotland (the transport agency of the Scottish Government)—formed the Scottish Partnership Group for high-speed rail to campaign for the extension of the HS2 project north to Edinburgh and Glasgow. In December 2011, it published a study that outlined a case for extending high-speed rail to Scotland, proposing a route north from Manchester to Edinburgh and Glasgow as well as an extension to Newcastle upon Tyne.

The proposed link would have reduced journey times between the two cities to under 30minutes and was planned to open by 2024, eventually connecting to the high-speed network being developed in England. The plan was cancelled in 2016. In May 2015, HS2 Ltd had concluded that there was "no business case" to extend HS2 north into Scotland, and that high-speed rail services should run north on upgraded conventional track.

Bristol and Cardiff
The Department for Transport conducted a study on towns and cities that would lose economically from HS2, highlighting Bristol and Cardiff. With decreased journey times between London and Northern England under HS2, Cardiff in particular would be set to lose much of its competitive edge that arose from its proximity to London's financial and legal service companies, due to improved rail connections between London and Northern England.

Consequently, there are proposals to build a high-speed line between Birmingham to Cardiff or Bristol, creating an X-shaped high-speed network, with Birmingham at its centre. There have also been proposals for a new high-speed rail project in South Wales, beyond just Cardiff, to connect with the HS2 network.

HS1-HS2 link 
The earliest proposals for HS2 suggested that a link be built from HS2 to HS1, to allow direct trains to continental Europe, although this has been removed on grounds of cost and insufficient capacity for such trains on HS2 track. Various proposals have been made to allow trains to connect from HS2 to HS1, including HS4Air. Without this link passengers connecting between these lines will have to travel the short distance between Euston and St Pancras stations. Proposals have also been made to make this journey more convenient.

Connection to other lines

Existing main lines
A key feature of the HS2 proposals is that the new high-speed track will be connected to existing conventional track, adding to, not displacing, the current network. This will enable high-speed trains to reach destinations served only by slower high-speed tracks—such as Liverpool, Glasgow, and Edinburgh—using a mixture of conventional and high-speed track.

The proposed connections from the new high-speed tracks onto existing conventional tracks will be at junctions on the network at the following locations:

West Coast Main Line
Midland Main Line
 at East Midlands Parkway station in Nottinghamshire.
Northern Powerhouse Rail
 at Millington junction.
The route from London to the West Midlands will be the first stage of a line to Scotland, with passengers travelling to or from Scotland on through trains using a mixture of new high-speed and existing conventional tracks, with a saving of 45minutes from the opening of Phase 1.

Planned stations

London and Birmingham (Phase 1)

Central London

High Speed 2 shares a southern terminus with the West Coast Main Line at London Euston. Peak-hour capacity at the HS2 London terminal at Euston is predicted to more than triple when the network is fully operational, increasing from 11,300 to 34,900 passengers each way.  Upon completion, Euston will have 24 National Rail platforms, not including those on the London Underground's Northern and Victoria lines.

As part of the HS2 project, Euston will be remodelled to integrate with the current conventional rail station, and improved connections will be provided to the Euston Square tube station, which serves the Circle, Hammersmith & City, and Metropolitan lines. Euston will also be better connected with HS1's terminus at St Pancras, including a proposed station on Crossrail 2 under the British Library. With St Pancras's own links with King's Cross station, a "mega-station"—along the Euston Road from Euston Square in the west to King's Cross St Pancras in the east—will be the result.

West London

Old Oak Common railway station will also be connected, via out of station interchange, with London Overground stations at Old Oak Common Lane on the North London line and Hythe Road on the West London line.

In May 2020, the Old Oak and Park Royal Development Corporation (OPDC) approved planning permission for the UK's largest new-build railway station at Old Oak Common. The construction contract was awarded to Balfour Beatty, Vinci and Systra (BBVS). The -long station box will have fourteen platforms.

Birmingham airport

Birmingham Interchange will be a through station situated in suburban Solihull, within a triangle of land enclosed by the M42, A45, and A452 highways. A people mover with a capacity of over 2,100 passengers per hour in each direction will connect the station to the National Exhibition Centre, Birmingham Airport, and the existing Birmingham International railway station. The AirRail Link people-mover already operates between Birmingham International station and the airport. In addition, there is a proposal to extend the West Midlands Metro to serve the station.

In 2010, Birmingham Airport's chief executive, Paul Kehoe, stated that HS2 is a key element in increasing the number of flights using the airport, with added patronage by inhabitants of London and the South East, as HS2 will reduce travel times from London to Birmingham Airport to under 40minutes.

Birmingham city centre

Birmingham Curzon Street will be the terminal station at the end of a branch that connects to the mainline via a triangle junction at Coleshill. A station of the same name existed on the site between 1838 and 1966; the surviving Grade I listed station building will be retained and renovated.

Passenger interchange with Moor Street would be at street level, across Moor Street Queensway; interchange with New Street would be via a pedestrian walkway between Moor Street and New Street (opened in 2013). In September 2018, one of Birmingham's oldest pubs, the Fox and Grapes, was demolished to make way for the new developments. The West Midlands Metro will be extended to serve the station.

Development planning for the Fazeley Street quarter of Birmingham has changed as a result of HS2. Prior to the announcement of the HS2 station, Birmingham City University had planned to build a new campus in Eastside. The proposed Eastside development will now include a new museum quarter, with the original station building becoming a new museum of photography, fronting onto a new Curzon Square, which will also be home to Ikon 2, a museum of contemporary art.

Clearing the site for construction commenced in December 2018. Grimshaw Architects received planning permission for three applications in April 2020.

Birmingham to Manchester (Phases 2a and 2b)
Proposals for these station locations were announced on 28 January 2013.

Birmingham to Crewe (Phase 2a)
HS2 will pass through Staffordshire and Cheshire. The line will run through a tunnel under the Crewe junction, bypassing the existing Crewe station.  The HS2 line will be linked to the West Coast Main Line via a grade-separated junction just south of Crewe, enabling "conventional compatible" trains exiting the high-speed line to call at Crewe station. In 2014, the chairman of HS2 advocated a dedicated hub station in Crewe. In November 2015 it was announced that the Crewe hub completion would be brought forward to 2027. In November 2017, the government and Network Rail supported a proposal to build the hub station on the existing station site, with a junction onto the West Coast Main Line north of the station. This will enable through-trains to bypass the station via a tunnel under the station and run directly onto the West Coast Main Line.

Manchester Airport (Phase 2b)

Manchester Airport High Speed station is a planned HS2 through-station serving Manchester Airport. It was recommended in 2013 by local authorities, during the consultation stage. Construction will depend on part funding by private investment from the Manchester Airports Group.

Current proposals do not detail passenger interchange methods; various options are being considered to integrate the new station with existing transport networks, including extending the Manchester Metrolink airport tram line to connect the HS2 station with the existing airport railway station.

If the station is built, it is estimated that the average journey time from London Euston to Manchester Airport would be 59minutes.

Manchester Piccadilly High Speed (Phase 2b)

A new Manchester Piccadilly High Speed station is planned to be built on a viaduct parallel to the north side of the existing station. The station will have six platforms on three islands for both terminating High Speed 2 trains from London and Birmingham as well as Northern Powerhouse Rail trains to Liverpool, Warrington, Huddersfield, Leeds, and beyond. The present Piccadilly Metrolink stop is proposed to be relocated from ground-level, below the existing station platforms, to a new larger four-platform stop located underground below the high-speed station. Provision for a second ground-level Metrolink stop at the eastern end of the high-speed station—to service future Metrolink extensions—to be called Piccadilly Central, also form part of the plans.

Construction

The main stages of construction officially began on 4 September 2020, following previous delays. The civil engineering aspect of the construction of Phase 1 is worth roughly £6.6billion, with preparation including over 8,000 boreholes for ground investigation.

Euston station in London
In October 2018, demolition began on the former carriage sheds at Euston station. This will allow the start of construction at the throat of the station at Mornington Street Bridge, and twin-bore  tunnels to West Ruislip. In January 2019, the taxi rank at Euston was moved to a temporary site at the front of the station so that demolition of the One Euston Square and Grant Thornton House tower blocks could commence. The demolition period was scheduled to last ten months.

In June 2020, workers finished the demolition of the western ramp and canopy of the station. This part of the station had housed the parcels depot, which fell into disuse after parcel traffic shifted to being serviced by road.

Chiltern tunnels

In July 2020, work was completed on a -high headwall at the southern portal of the twin-bore tunnel. The  Chiltern tunnels will take three years to dig, using two  tunnel boring machines (TBM).

The tunnels are lined with concrete that is cast in sections at a purpose-built facility at the southern portal; the first sections were cast in March 2021. The second TBM, Cecilia, was launched in July 2021. As of October 2022, 4miles of tunnel have been dug by each machine.

Colne Valley Viaduct

The Colne Valley Viaduct is a -long bridge to carry the line over the Colne Valley Regional Park in Hillingdon, West London. The viaduct will be situated between the Northolt and Chiltern tunnels. 

The bridge-building machine was launched in May 2022, signalling the start of construction. When completed (expected in May 2025) it will be the longest railway viaduct in the United Kingdom.

Northolt Tunnels

TBM Sushila, the first of four TBMs to be used on the Northolt tunnels, was launched from the West Ruislip portal in October 2022. The tunnels are planned to be completed in August 2024.

Other sites
Construction of Old Oak Common station began in June 2021.

In December 2021, TBM Dorothy was launched, tunnelling under Long Itchington Wood. It completed the first bore in July 2022, and was returned to its initial position to complete the second, parallel bore. Dorothy started the second bore in November 2022, with a planned completion date of summer 2023.

Opposition to construction
In 2017, a protest camp was established at Harvil Road in the Colne Valley Regional Park by environmental activists intending to protect the wildlife habitats of bats and owls. The protesters asserted that freshwater aquifer would be affected by HS2 construction and this would impact London's water supply. The camp included members of the Green Party and Extinction Rebellion. In January 2020, HS2 bailiffs began to evict people from the site, after HS2 has exercised its right to compulsorily purchase the land from Hillingdon council, which had not been prepared to sell the land otherwise. A prosecution of two activists accused of aggravated trespass had previously collapsed in 2019, when HS2 was unable to prove it owned the land the activists were allegedly trespassing upon.

In early 2020, during the clearance of woodland along the route, the group HS2 Rebellion squatted on a site in the Colne Valley, aiming to block construction; the protesters argued that public money would be more suited to supporting the National Health Service during the COVID-19 pandemic. HS2 and Hillingdon council both moved to get separate injunctions allowing them to remove the squatters. In March 2020, another camp was set up, at Jones' Hill Wood in Buckinghamshire. In October 2020, activists, including "Swampy", were evicted from tree houses there.

In January 2021, it was revealed that protesters had dug a tunnel underneath Euston Square Gardens. The protesters were criticised for endangering themselves and emergency services personnel, and for being "costly to the taxpayer". In June 2021, HS2 stated that protests had so far cost the company £75million.

In the Spring of 2021, the Bluebell Woods Protection Camp was set up at Cash's Pit, adjacent to the A51 road, on the line of the proposed route as it passes north of the village of Swynnerton in the county of Staffordshire.

There have been incidents of violence directed towards HS2 workers.

Operation
The government proposes that by 2033 HS2 will provide up to 18 trains an hour to and from London. The service pattern is not yet finalised; the 2020 business case contains a suggested service pattern. Some services are to operate as two connected units that are eventually detached to serve multiple northern destinations.

Proposed service pattern

The proposed service pattern may change, depending on whether Phase 2a opens alongside Phase 1.

When the whole of Phase 2 is open, the following service pattern is proposed:

Operator
The ongoing servicing and maintenance of High Speed 2 is included within the West Coast Partnership franchise, which was awarded to Avanti West Coast—a joint venture between FirstGroup and Trenitalia—when the franchise commenced in December 2019. Avanti West Coast will be responsible for maintaining all aspects of the service, including ticketing, trains, and the maintenance of the infrastructure. The initial franchise contract is for the first three-to-five years of HS2's operation.

Fares
The government has stated that it would "assume a fares structure in line with that of the existing railway", and HS2 should attract sufficient passengers to not have to charge premium fares. Paul Chapman, in charge of HS2's public relations strategy, suggested that there could be last-minute tickets sold at discount rates. He said, "when you have got a train departing on a regular basis, maybe every five or ten minutes, in that last half-hour before the train leaves and you have got empty seats...you can start selling tickets for £5 and £10 at a standby rate."

Capacity

HS2 will carry up to 26,000 people per hour, with anticipated annual passenger numbers of 85million. The line will be used intensively, with up to 17 trains per hour travelling to and from Euston. As all trains will be capable of the same speed, capacity is increased as faster trains will not need to reduce speed for slower freight and commuter trains. By diverting the fastest services to run on HS2, capacity is released on the West Coast Main Line, East Coast Main Line, and Midland Main Line, allowing for more slow freight trains and local, regional, and commuter services. Andrew McNaughton, Chief Technical Director, said, "Basically, as a dedicated passenger railway, we can carry more people per hour than two motorways. It's phenomenal capacity. It pretty much triples the number of seats long-distance to the North of England".

Infrastructure
The Department for Transport report on High Speed Rail published in March 2010 sets out the specifications for a high-speed line. It will be built to a Continental European structure gauge (as was HS1) and will conform to European Union technical standards for interoperability for high-speed rail.

Rolling stock

In December 2021, DfT and HS2 announced that the rolling-stock contract had been awarded to the Hitachi–Alstom joint venture. The trains will be based on a revised version of the Zefiro V300. The first train is expected to be delivered around 2027.
Vehicle bodies will be welded and fitted out at the Hitachi facility in Newton Aycliffe, bogies will be manufactured at the Alstom facility in Crewe, and the final assembly of body, bogies, and other systems will take place at Alstom in Derby.

Procurement timeline
The 2010 DfT government command-paper outlined some requirements for the train design among its recommendations for design standards for the HS2 network. A photograph of a French AGV was used as an example of the latest high-speed rail technology. The paper addressed the particular problem of designing trains to continental European standards, which use taller and wider rolling stock, requiring a larger structure gauge than the rail network in Great Britain.

The report proposed the development of two new types of train to make the best use of the line:
 Wider and taller trains built to a Continental European loading gauge, which would be confined to the high-speed network (including HS1 and HS2) and other lines cleared to their loading gauge. This option is dropped.
 Conventional trains, capable of high-speed but built to a British loading gauge, permitting them to leave the high-speed track to join conventional routes such as the West Coast Main Line, Midland Main Line and East Coast Main Line. HS2 Ltd choose this option, eventually. Such trains would allow operating of HS2 services to the north of England and Scotland, although these trains would operate slightly slower than the fastest existing services using tilting trains on conventional track. HS2 Ltd has stated that, because these trains must be specifically designed for the British network and cannot be bought "off-the-shelf", these conventional trains were expected to be around 50% more expensive, costing around £40million per train rather than £27million for the captive stock.

It has been reported that these longer trains would have approximately 1,100 seats, with Andrew McNaughton, technical director of HS2, stating "family areas will alleviate the stress of parents worried that their children are annoying other passengers who are maybe trying to work."

The DfT report also considered the possibility of "gauge clearance" work on non-high-speed lines as an alternative to conventional trains. This work would involve extensive reconstruction of stations, tunnels, and bridges, and the widening of clearances to allow Continental European–profile trains to run beyond the high-speed network. The report concluded that, although initial outlay on commissioning new rolling stock would be high, it would cost less than the widespread disruption of rebuilding large tracts of Britain's rail infrastructure.

Alstom, one of the bidders for the contract to build the trains, proposed in October 2016 that HS2 "tilting trains" could run on HS2 and conventional tracks, to increase overall speeds when running on conventional tracks.

On the conventional network, the energy costs are £2.00 per km and £2.60 per km, respectively.

The first batch of rolling stock for HS2 was specified in the Train Technical Specification issued with the Invitation To Tender (ITT), which was initially published in July 2018, and revised in March 2019, following clarification questions from tenderers. Bidding for the contract to design, build, and maintain the trains was opened in 2017 and was originally expected to be awarded in 2019. The first batch includes 54 trainsets with a maximum speed of at least  and with the capability to operate on both HS2 and existing infrastructure.

The following suppliers were shortlisted to tender following the initial 5 June 2019 submission:
 Alstom Transport
 Bombardier Transportation and Hitachi Rail Europe consortium. Bombardier were subsequently acquired by Alstom Transport in January 2021 Bombardier and Hitachi were existing suppliers of Frecciarossa 1000 rolling stock for the Italian Frecciarossa high speed service.
 Construcciones y Auxiliar de Ferrocarriles (CAF)
 Patentes Talgo proposed its AVRIL train used by Spanish operator Renfe.
 Siemens Mobility

In September 2021, the HS2 board endorsed the decision to award the rolling stock manufacturing and maintenance contracts. In November 2021, it was reported that the decision remained with the Department for Transport for approval.

Maintenance depots

A rolling-stock depot will be built in Washwood Heath, Birmingham, covering all of Phase 1 and Phase 2a. In July 2018, the then Transport Secretary, Chris Grayling, announced that the rolling stock depot for the eastern leg of Phase 2b would be at Gateway 45 near to the M1 motorway in Leeds. An additional depot in Annandale, north of Gretna Green and south of Kirkpatrick Fleming, was announced in 2020.

The infrastructure maintenance depot (IMD) for Phase 1 will be constructed roughly halfway along the route, north of Aylesbury, between Steeple Claydon and Calvert in Buckinghamshire. This site is adjacent to the intersection of HS2 and the East West Rail route. In the working draft environmental statement for Phase 2b, the IMD on the eastern leg is proposed for near Staveley, Derbyshire, on a former chemical works site, while Phase 2b, the western leg, will have one near Stone, Staffordshire.

Journey times

The DfT's latest revised estimates of journey times for some major destinations have been set out in various government documents, including the business cases for each phase and other related documents.

From London

To dedicated HS2 stations

To other stations

From Birmingham

Funding

The Department for Transport initially estimated the cost of the first  section, from London to Birmingham, at between £15.8 and £17.4billion, and the entire Y-shaped  network at between £30.9 and £36billion, not including the Manchester Airport station which would be locally funded. In June 2013, the projected cost (in 2011 prices) rose by £10billion, to £42.6billion, with an extra £7.5billion budgeted for rolling stock, for a total of £50.1billion. Less than a week later, it was revealed that the DfT had been using an outdated model to estimate the productivity increases associated with the railway. In 2014, the most commonly cited cost applied to the project was £56.6billion, which corresponds to the June 2013 funding package, as adjusted for inflation by the House of Lords' Economic Affairs Committee in 2015. Over sixty years, the line was estimated to provide £92.2billion of net benefits and £43.6billion in new revenue. As a result, the benefit–cost ratio of the project was then estimated to be 2.30; that is, it is projected to provide £2.30 of benefits for every £1 spent.

Cost increases have led to reductions in the planned track; for instance, the link between HS1 and HS2 was later dropped on cost grounds. In April 2016, Sir Jeremy Heywood, a top UK civil servant, was reviewing the HS2 project to trim costs and gauge whether the project could be kept within budget. The cost of HS2 is around 25 per cent higher than the international average, which was blamed on the higher population density and cost of land, in a report by PwC. The costs are also higher because the line will run directly into city centres instead of joining existing networks on the outskirts. By 2019, Oakervee estimated that the projected cost, in 2019 prices, had increased from £80.7billion to £87.7billion—the budget in 2019 prices was at the time of the Oakervee Review only £62.4billion—and the benefit–cost ratio had dropped to between 1.3 and 1.5. Lord Berkeley, the deputy chair of the Oakervee Review, disagreed with Oakervee's findings and suggested that the cost of the project could now be as high as £170billion. As of 2020, the budget envelope set out by the DfT is £98billion. HS2 Ltd tapped into a £4.3billion contingency fund to meet £1.7billion of extra costs resulting from delays caused by the COVID-19 pandemic.

Sources of funding other than central government have been mooted for additional links. HS2 received funding from the European Union's Connecting Europe Facility.

Wales' classification
HS2's classification as an England and Wales project has been heavily criticised by MPs and Welsh Government ministers in Wales, arguing that HS2's classification over Wales gives little benefit or any reasoning, as there is no dedicated high-speed or conventional infrastructure of HS2 planned in Wales, minimal HS2 services to the north of Wales, and a Department for Transport study detailing that, overall, HS2 is forecasted to have a "negative economic impact on Wales", as well as on Bristol in England. 

As rail infrastructure is not devolved to Wales, it means that devolved authorities are entitled to less of the Barnett Formula, when funding is increased to the devolved administrations in proportion to an increase in funding for England or, in this case, England and Wales. The Welsh Government has stated that it wants its "fair share" from HS2's billions in funding, which the Welsh Government stated would be roughly £5billion. By February 2020, the Welsh government received £755million in HS2-linked funding, with the UK Government stating it was "investing record amounts in Wales' railway infrastructure" and that the Welsh government has actually received a "significant uplift" in Barnett-based funding due to the UK Government's increased funding of HS2. Simon Hart, Secretary of State for Wales, stated that Network Rail would invest £1.5billion in Wales' railways between 2019 and 2024.

Currently, trains between north Wales and London take roughly threehours and forty-fiveminutes, with HS2 set to decrease the travel time between Crewe and London by thirtyminutes. However, with no confirmed services directly between Euston and north Wales, passengers could be required to change at Crewe, and use the North Wales Main Line between Crewe and Holyhead, where any improvements have failed to receive funding.

The DfT study estimated that the South Wales economy could lose up to £200million per year, due to the region's "inferior transport infrastructure". The same study highlighted that north Wales could benefit from faster journey times and a potential boost for the region's economy, with the DfT forecasting a benefit of £50million from HS2, although with a potential £150million negative economic impact to Wales overall. First Minister of Wales Mark Drakeford described in a letter to UK Prime Minister Boris Johnson that Wales' railway system has been "systematically neglected" and that HS2's funding further contributes to it. HS2 has increased calls for Wales' rail infrastructure to be fully devolved, as it is in Scotland. 

In July 2021, the Welsh Affairs Committee advised that HS2 should be reclassified as an "England only" project, allowing Wales to be entitled to its Barnett Formula, in line with Scotland and Northern Ireland; but the committee also called for the establishment of a "Wales Rail Board" instead of devolving rail infrastructure to Wales, and for the upgrading of the North Wales Main Line.

Perspectives

Government rationale
A 2008 paper, "Delivering a Sustainable Transport System", identified fourteen strategic national transport corridors in England, and described the LondonWest MidlandsNorth West England route as the "single most important and heavily used" and also as the one which presented "both the greatest challenges in terms of future capacity and the greatest opportunities to promote a shift of passenger and freight traffic from road to rail". The paper noted that railway passenger numbers had been growing significantly in recent years—doubling from 1995 to 2015—and that the RugbyEuston section was expected to have insufficient capacity sometime around 2025. This is despite the West Coast Main Line upgrade on some sections of the track—which was completed in 2008—lengthened trains, and an assumption that plans to upgrade the route with cab signalling would be realised.

According to the DfT, the primary purpose of HS2 is to provide additional capacity on the rail network from London to the Midlands and North. It says the new line "would improve rail services from London to cities in the North of England and Scotland, and that the chosen route to the west of London will improve passenger transport links to Heathrow Airport". Additionally, the new line will be connected to the Great Western Main Line and Crossrail at Old Oak Common railway station; this will provide links links with East and West London and the Thames Valley.

In launching the project, the DfT announced that HS2 between London and the West Midlands would follow a different alignment from the West Coast Main Line, rejecting the option of further upgrading or building new tracks alongside the West Coast Main Line as being too costly and disruptive, and because the Victorian-era West Coast Main Line alignment was unsuitable for very high speeds. A study by Network Rail found that upgrading the existing network to deliver the same extra capacity released by constructing HS2 would require fifteen years of weekend closures. This does not include the additional express seats added by HS2, nor would it deliver any journey time reductions.

Support

HS2 is officially supported by the Labour Party, Conservative Party, and the Liberal Democrats. The Conservative–Liberal Democrat coalition government formed in May 2010 stated, in its initial programme for government, its commitment to creating a high-speed rail network.

In a report brought out in 2019, the High Speed Rail Industry Leaders group (HSRIL) stated that in order to meet 2050 carbon emissions targets, HS2 must be built. Network Rail support the project and state that upgrading the existing network instead of building HS2 would take longer and cause more disruption to passengers.

Opposition

The Green Party would scrap HS2 and spend the money saved on local transport links. The Brexit Party and the UK Independence Party also oppose the scheme. At the local-government level, eighteen councils affected by the planned route set up the 51M group, named for the cost of HS2 for each individual constituency in millions of pounds. Before he became prime minister, Boris Johnson was personally against HS2. Other former and current Conservative MPs against HS2 include Cheryl Gillan and Liam Fox.

Stop HS2 was set up in 2010 to co-ordinate local opposition and campaign on the national level against HS2. Groups such as the Wildlife Trusts and the National Trust oppose the project, based on concerns about destruction of local biodiversity.

Environmental and community impact
The impact of HS2 has received particular attention in the Chiltern Hills, an Area of Outstanding Natural Beauty, where the line passes through the Misbourne Valley. In January 2011, the government announced that two million trees would be planted along sections of the route to mitigate the visual impact. The route was changed so as to tunnel underneath the southern end of the Chilterns, with the line emerging northwest of Amersham. The work on the tunnel extension has started, but there is a challenge from local planning authorities that the work does not have permission. The tunnel extension has been referred to the minister of state for a decision.

Amid concerns that HS2 was carrying out preparatory works during nesting season, Springwatch presenter and conservationist Chris Packham filed for a judicial review of the decision to proceed and an emergency injunction to prevent construction, having crowdfunded £100,000 to cover legal fees. His bid failed before the High Court of Justice, which ruled that a judicial review "had no real prospect of success". Packham was subsequently given leave to appeal to the Court of Appeal, with Lord Justice Lewison ruling that there was "considerable public interest". On 31 July 2020, Packham lost his case in the Court of Appeal.

Property demolition, land take and compensation

Phase 1 is estimated to result in the demolition of more than 400 houses: 250 around Euston; 20–30 between Old Oak Common and West Ruislip; around 50 in Birmingham; and the remainder in pockets along the route. No Grade I or Grade II* listed buildings will be demolished, but six Grade II listed buildings will be, with alterations to four and removal and relocation of eight. These included a 17th-century farm in Uxbridge once visited by Queen Elizabeth I in 1602, and the Eagle and Tun pub, which was the set for the UB40 music video for Red Red Wine. In Birmingham, the Curzon Gate student residence and the Fox and Grapes, a derelict pub, were demolished; Birmingham City University requested £30million in compensation after the plans were announced. Once original plans had been released in 2010, the Exceptional Hardship Scheme (EHS) was set up to compensate homeowners whose houses were to be affected by the line at the government's discretion. Phase 1 of the scheme came to an end on 17 June 2010 and Phase 2 ended in 2013.

Ancient woodland impact
The Woodland Trust states that 108 ancient woodlands will be damaged due to HS2, 33 sites of Special Scientific Interest will be affected, and 21 designated nature reserves will be destroyed. In England, the term "ancient woodland" refers to areas that have been constantly forested since at least 1600. Such areas accommodate a complex and diverse ecology of plants and animals and are recognised as "irreplaceable habitat" by the government. 52,000 such sites exist. According to the Trust,  are threatened with total loss from the construction of phases 1 and 2. Rare species such as the dingy skipper and white clawed crayfish could see a decreased population or even localised extinction upon the realization of the project. To mitigate the loss, HS2 Ltd says that seven million trees and shrubs will be planted during Phase 1, creating  of new woods. A further  of natural habitats are also planned. HS2 Ltd disputes the Trust's figure, saying it includes ancient woodlands several kilometres from the route and that only 43 ancient woodlands are directly impacted, of which over 80% will remain intact.

Carbon dioxide emissions
In 2007, the DfT commissioned a report, "Estimated Carbon Impact of a New North-South Line", from Booz Allen Hamilton, to investigate the likely overall carbon impact associated with the construction and operation of a new rail line to either Manchester or Scotland, including the extent of carbon dioxide emission reduction or increase from a shift to rail use, and a comparison with the case in which no new high-speed lines were built. The report concluded that there was no net carbon benefit in the foreseeable future, taking only the route to Manchester. Additional emissions from building a new rail route would be larger in the first ten years, at least, when compared to a model where no new line was built.

The 2006 Eddington Report cautioned against the common argument of modal shift from aviation to high-speed rail as a carbon-emissions benefit since only 1.2% of UK carbon emissions are due to domestic commercial aviation, and since rail transport energy efficiency is reduced as speed increases. The paper questioned the value-for-money of high-speed rail as a method of reducing carbon emissions, but noted that with a switch to carbon-free or carbon-neutral electricity production the case becomes much more favourable.

The "High-Speed Rail Command Paper", published in March 2010, stated that the project was likely to be roughly carbon neutral. The House of Commons Transport Select Committee report in November 2011 (paragraph 77) concluded that the government's assertion that HS2 would have substantial carbon reduction benefits did not stand up to scrutiny. At best, the select committee found, HS2 could make a small contribution to the government's carbon-reduction targets. However, this was dependent on making rapid progress in reducing carbon emissions from UK electricity generation. Others argue these reports do not properly account for the carbon reduction benefits coming from the modal shift to rail for shorter-distance journeys, due to the capacity realised by HS2 on existing mainlines resulting in better local services.

The Phase 1 environmental statement estimates that 5.8–6.2milliontonnes of carbon dioxide equivalent emissions will be involved in the construction of that section of the line, with operation of the line estimated to be carbon negative thereafter; operational emissions, modal shift, and other environmental mitigations—such as tree planting and decarbonisation of the electrical grid—are expected to provide a saving of 3milliontonnes of -equivalent emissions over sixty years of operation. The carbon dioxide emissions per passenger-kilometre in 2030 are estimated to be 8grams for high-speed rail, as opposed to 22grams for conventional intercity rail, 67grams for private car transport, and 170grams for domestic aviation.

The government stated that one-third of the carbon footprint from constructing Phase 1 results from tunnelling, the amount of which has been increased following requests from local residents to mitigate the impact of the railway on habitats and its visual impact.

Noise
HS2 Ltd stated that 21,300 dwellings could experience a noticeable increase in rail noise and that 200 non-residential receptors (community, education, healthcare, and recreational/social facilities) within  of the preferred route have the potential to experience significant noise impacts. The government has stated that trees planted to create a visual barrier will reduce noise pollution.

Public consultations
HS2 Ltd announced in March 2012 that it would conduct consultations with local people and organisations along the London-to-West-Midlands route, through community and planning forums, and an environment forum. It confirmed that the consultations would be conducted in line with the terms of the Aarhus Convention. HS2 Ltd set up 25 community forums along the Phase 1 route in March 2012. The forums were intended to allow local authorities, residents associations, special interest groups, and environment bodies in each community forum area to engage with HS2 Ltd. Jeremy Wright, Member of Parliament for Kenilworth and Southam, stated that in his area the community forums were not a success since HS2 had not provided clear details about the project and took up to 18 months to respond to his constituents.

Since the announcement of Phase 1, the government has had plans to create an overall 'Y shaped' line with termini in Manchester and Leeds. Since the intentions to further extend were announced, an additional compensation scheme was set up. Consultations with those affected were set up over late 2012 and January 2013, to allow homeowners to express their concerns within their local community.

The results of the consultations are not yet known, but Alison Munro, chief executive of HS2 Ltd, has stated that it is also looking at other options, including property bonds. The statutory blight regime would apply to any route confirmed for a new high-speed line following the public consultations, which took place between 2011 and January 2013.

Political impact
The revision of the route through South Yorkshire, which replaced the original plans for a station at Meadowhall with a station off the HS2 tracks at Sheffield, was cited as a major reason for the collapse of the Sheffield City Region devolution deal signed in 2015; Sheffield City Council's successful lobbying for a city-centre station—in opposition to Barnsley, Doncaster, and Rotherham's preference for the Meadowhall option—caused Doncaster and Barnsley councils to seek an all-Yorkshire devolution deal instead.

Archaeological discoveries 

Between 2018 and early 2022, HS2 examined more than 100 archaeological sites along the railway route.

Early discoveries during construction were two Victorian era glass jar time capsules found during the demolition of the derelict National Temperance Hospital in Camden, dating from 1879 and 1884. The capsules contained newspapers, the hospital's rules, pro-temperance movement material, and official records.

The "Hillingdon Hoard" of more than 300 late Iron Age potins was discovered in by archaeologists working on the railway project in Hillingdon, West London. Archaeologists working on the railway had previously discovered hunter-gatherer flint tools from a much earlier (early Mesolithic) site in the eastern Colne Valley within the London Borough of Hillingdon, evidence of what may be the earliest settlers of what is now Greater London.

Before construction could begin on the new Euston station, archaeologists had to remove roughly 40,000 skeletons from the former burial ground of St James's Church, which was in use between 1790 and 1853 and lies on the site of the new station. Many of the skeletons were identifiable by surviving lead coffin plates, including the long lost remains of explorer Captain Matthew Flinders, who is to be re-buried in his home town of Donington, Lincolnshire. The rest of the remains are to reburied at Brookwood Cemetery, Surrey. There were also excavations to remove roughly 6,500 skeletons from a burial ground on the site of the new Curzon Street Station in Birmingham. Other notable finds in the burials were grave goods such as coins, plates, toys, and necklaces, as well as evidence of body snatching. Excavations in Birmingham also uncovered the world's oldest railway roundhouse.

In July 2020, archaeological teams announced a number of discoveries near Wendover, Buckinghamshire. The skeleton of an Iron Age man was discovered face-down in a ditch with his hands bound together under his pelvis, suggesting that he may be a victim of a murder or execution. Archaeologists also discovered the remains of a Roman buried in a lead coffin, and stated that he may have been someone of high status due to the expensive method of burial. One of the most significant finds was that of a large circular monument of wooden posts  in diameter with features aligned with the winter solstice, similar to that of Stonehenge in Wiltshire. A golden stater from the 1st century BC was also discovered, with archaeologists stating that it was almost certainly minted in Britain.

In Coleshill, Warwickshire, the remains of large manor and ornamental gardens, laid out by Robert Digby in the 16th century, were excavated.

In September 2021, archaeologists from LP-Archaeology, led by Rachel Wood, have announced the discovery of the remains of old St Mary's Church in Stoke Mandeville, Buckinghamshire, while working on the route of the HS2 railway. The Norman parish church structure, which dates back to 1080, fell into ruin after 1866, when a new church was built elsewhere in the area. Discovered in the ruins of the Norman church were medieval markings in the form of drilled holes on two stones; these are variously interpreted as ritual protective marks, or as an early sundial. Researchers' discovery of flint walls forming a square structure, enclosed by a circular borderline, indicate that the Norman church as built on an earlier Anglo-Saxon church. As part of excavations, approximately 3,000 bodies were moved to a new burial site. Evidence of a settlement from the Roman period was also discovered nearby.

In early 2021, a significant site called "Blackgrounds" (for its rich dark soil) was discovered on what was previously pastureland near the village of Chipping Warden in South Northamptonshire, close to River Cherwell. While the existence of an archaeological site in the region had been previously known, the excavations showed an unexpectedly significant site. A team of 80 with the MOLA Headland Infrastructure archaeological consortium, which is working with HS2 Ltd, excavated the site, which consisted of a small Iron Age village that became a Roman town. The population grew, from about 30 roundhouses during the Iron Age, into a significant Roman settlement with a population in the hundreds. Discoveries included a particularly large Roman road; more than 300 Roman coins; and jewelry, glass vessels, and decorative pottery (including samian pottery imported from Gaul), as well as signs of cosmetics. Roman-era workshops and kilns were discovered, along with at least four wells. A pair of shackles was also unearthed. Taken together, the evidence was indicative of a prosperous trading site.

Environmental mitigation
A scheme has been announced to use the chalk excavated from the Chiltern tunnel to rewild a section of the Colne Valley Western Slopes. The  scheme will take its inspiration from the Knepp wilding, and will stretch along the line from the viaduct at Denham Country Park to the Chiltern tunnel's southern portal.

See also
 Rail transport in Great Britain
 High-speed rail in the United Kingdom
 High-speed rail in Europe
 High Speed 1, also known as the Channel Tunnel Rail Link, the high-speed line between London and the Channel Tunnel that opened in 2007.
 UK Ultraspeed, a rejected proposal for a magnetic-levitation line between London and Glasgow.
 High Speed 3, an unofficial name generally used to refer to the Northern Powerhouse Rail project.
 HS4Air, a rejected proposal to link HS2 with High Speed 1 at Ashford International station in Kent, via Heathrow and Gatwick airports.
 HighSpeed UK, an alternative proposal for high-speed services from London to Manchester and Liverpool, but via Leicester and Sheffield.

Notes

References

Sources

 
 
 
 DfT (2009): 
 DfT (2010): 
 HS2 (2010):

Detailed maps
 HS2 Phase One (2012 Maps): 
 HS2 Phase Two (2013 Maps):

External links 

 

 
Department for Transport
High-speed railway lines in the United Kingdom
High-speed railway lines under construction
Private companies limited by guarantee of the United Kingdom
Proposed railway lines in England
Proposed railway lines in London
Proposed railway lines in the United Kingdom
2020s in rail transport
2030s in rail transport